Pavo may refer to:
 Pavo (bird), a genus of peafowl
 Pavo (constellation), in astronomy
 Pavo (given name), a masculine Croatian name
 Pavo, Georgia, United States

See also
 Paavo, Finnish and Estonian given name
 Pavão (disambiguation) (Portuguese )
Peacock (disambiguation)
Peafowl